The Davos Congress Centre is the major convention centre in Davos, Switzerland. It opened in 1969 and has undergone major transformations and extensions in 1979, 1989 and 2010.  It has hosted the meetings of the World Economic Forum since 1971.

References

Further reading
Goodman, Peter S. (2022). Davos Man: How the Billionaires Devoured the World. New York: HarperCollins. .

External links

Official website
Congress Centre Davos: Documentation and History

Convention centres in Switzerland
Davos
Buildings and structures in Graubünden
Tourist attractions in Graubünden
Event venues established in 1969
1969 establishments in Switzerland
20th-century architecture in Switzerland